Dillon's Regiment (French: Régiment de Dillon) was first raised in Ireland in 1688 by Theobald, 7th Viscount Dillon, for the Jacobite side in the Williamite War. He was then killed at the Battle of Aughrim in 1691.

Williamite War

Dillon's Regiment was first raised as part of the Irish Army in 1688 by Theobald, 7th Viscount Dillon. During the Williamite War the regiment went to France in April 1690 as part of Lord Mountcashel's Irish Brigade, in exchange for some French regiments amounting to 6,000 troops. After the Treaty of Limerick in 1691, the regiment remained in the service of the kings of France under its present name. It was next commanded in France by Theobald's younger son, Colonel Arthur Dillon, until 1733. In 1767 Arthur Dillon great grandson of Theobald Dillon took command of the regiment. During the American War of Independence, the regiment participated in the Capture of Grenada, the Siege of Savannah, the Invasion of Tobago, the Capture of Sint Eustatius, and the Siege of Brimstone Hill.

Shadow formations
(Henry) Dillon's Regiment: Émigré elements of the French regiment passed into William Pitt's British Catholic Irish Brigade in 1794. These elements comprised the greater part of the officers who had emigrated from France, and new recruits raised on the Dillon lands in Ireland. Henry Dillon, a brother of Arthur Dillon was given command of the regiment. However, on campaign in Jamaica and Haiti, it had such losses, mainly due to the unhealthy climate, that it was disbanded in 1798. The flags and ensigns were returned to Charles, Lord Dillon, head of the Dillon family in Ireland.

(Edward) Dillon's Regiment: (Edward) Dillon's Regiment of Foot was raised in northern Italy in 1795, by Col. Edward Dillon, formerly of the Irish Brigade in France, to fight for the English in the Mediterranean.

See also
 Arthur Dillon (1750-1794)
 Flight of the Wild Geese
 French Revolution Collection on Camille Desmoulins, Lucile Duplessis, and Arthur Dillon at Florida State University Libraries

References

Further reading
 McGarry, Stephen. Irish Brigades Abroad. (2013)

1688 establishments in Ireland
Disbanded units and formations of France
Dillon
Military units and formations of France in the American Revolutionary War
Military units and formations established in 1688
Military units and formations disestablished in 1791
Infantry regiments of the Ancien Régime